Nazária is a municipality in the state of Piauí in the Northeast region of Brazil. Its population is 8,602 (2020) and its area is 363.6 km2.

See also
List of municipalities in Piauí

References

Municipalities in Piauí